HMS Brilliant was an  of the British Royal Navy which served from 1893 to 1918 in various colonial posts and off the British Isles as a hastily converted minelayer during the First World War.

Operational history
Brilliant was commissioned at Portsmouth on 1 October 1901 by Captain Hugh Pigot Williams, for service with the Cruiser Squadron. In May 1902 she was taken into Portsmouth for a refit, and on 16 August that year she took part in the fleet review held at Spithead for the coronation of King Edward VII. The following month she visited the Aegean Sea with other ships of her squadron for combined manoeuvres with the Mediterranean Fleet, returning to Portsmouth in October. Late that year she was ordered back to Gibraltar for temporary service in the Mediterranean to protect British interests in Morocco.

First World War
On 23 October 1914, Brilliant,  together with sister ship , and several sloops and destroyers, shelled German troops on the Belgian coast. On 28 October, Brilliant was on similar duty when she was hit by German return fire, killing one of her crew and wounding several more. On 11 November 1914 the torpedo-gunboat  was torpedoed and sunk in the Downs by the German submarine U-12. As a result, as Dover was not considered secure against submarine attack, Admiral Horace Hood, commander of the Dover Patrol and senior officer at the port of Dover, ordered Brilliant and Sirius to Sheerness to avoid the submarine hazard.  While based at Sheerness, Brilliant and Sirius served as guardships against possible German attack.

In June 1915, Brilliant served as guardship on the Tyne. On the night of 15/16 June 1915, the German airship L10 attacked targets on the Tyne, bombing Jarrow, Wallsend and South Shields. 18 were killed and 72 wounded by L10s bombs. Brilliant fired at L10 but the German airship was undamaged.

In July 1917 Brilliant was based at Lerwick in Shetland as a depot ship for the trawlers and patrol boats of the Auxiliary Patrol.

Wreck
In April 1918, Brilliant was deliberately scuttled in the mouth of Ostend harbour in Belgium during the failed First Ostend Raid. This operation was intended to block the harbour mouth and prevent the transit of German U-boats and other raiding craft from Bruges to the North Sea. German countermeasures were, however, too effective, and Brilliant and fellow blockship  were eventually destroyed by their crews outside the harbour mouth after running aground on a sandbank. The wrecks were broken up postwar.

References

Publications
 
 
 
 
 
 
 

 

Apollo-class cruisers
Ships built in Sheerness
1891 ships
World War I shipwrecks in the English Channel
Maritime incidents in 1918